Hold That Tiger is a live album by American alternative rock band Sonic Youth, recorded at the Cabaret Metro in Chicago on October 14, 1987. It featured songs from the album Sister. It was released on vinyl in 1991, with a CD release in 1998. Apparently, the actual tape of the live recording was sped up to fit vinyl, but was not slowed down again for the CD release.

Reception
Writing for AllMusic, Brian Flota said, "Sonic Youth is on safe ground here, not indulging themselves in the guitar freakouts that they frequently showcase during their live sets".

Track listing 
All tracks written by Sonic Youth except for the encore.
 "Intro" - 00:43
 "Schizophrenia" - 04:31
 "Tom Violence" - 02:44
 "White Cross" - 02:58
 "Kotton Krown" - 04:05
 "Stereo Sanctity" - 03:28
 "Brother James" - 03:22
 "Pipeline/Kill Time" - 04:04
 "Catholic Block" - 03:55
 "Tuff Gnarl" - 03:27
 "Death Valley '69" - 4:50
 "Beauty Lies in the Eye" - 02:40
 "Expressway to Yr. Skull" - 04:33
 "Pacific Coast Highway" - 05:00
Encore - Ramones Covers
 "Loudmouth" - 02:02
 "I Don't Want to Walk Around with You" - 01:34
 "Today Your Love, Tomorrow the World" - 02:01
 "Beat on the Brat" - 02:41

References 

1991 live albums
Sonic Youth live albums